Jacob Bannon (born October 15, 1976) is an American musician who is the vocalist, lyricist and graphic artist for the metalcore band Converge. He is the co-founder and owner of the record label Deathwish Inc. and the author of many visual works for independent punk rock and heavy metal musicians. Bannon has also composed and performed experimental music as Supermachiner with Ryan Parker and more recently as Wear Your Wounds.

Personal life 
Bannon was born in 1976. He grew up splitting his time between Andover in the Merrimack Valley, Charlestown, and East Boston on some weekends.

At 17, he graduated High School early and chose to work until heading to college. He relocated to metro Boston and attended college at The Art Institute of Boston, earning a Bachelors In Fine Arts for design in 1998, and subsequently taught the subject on a college level for a brief time. He also won the "Excellence In Design" accolade from the school. For a brief time, he instructed at the same college in their "Continuing Education" program. After working a variety of freelance design jobs at firms, he became a freelance Artist/Designer primarily working in the Independent music community. He is a vegetarian and follows a straight edge lifestyle. From 2005 to 2008, he has been nominated for the title of "World's Sexiest Vegetarian" by Peta2. He is concerned with the greyhound-racing industry, and is a dog owner, having owned rescued greyhounds, pitbulls, among others.

Bannon is also an avid mixed martial arts and kickboxing fan, having trained boxing, Muay Thai, and obtained a license as a MMA instructor in the state of Massachusetts, working occasionally as a judge. Accordingly, Deathwish has sponsored some MMA fighters. Bannon is known for his extensive tattoos. He received his first tattoo at the age of 15, which has subsequently been covered by other tattoos. He has been tattooed by Darren Brass, among many other artists. In 2013, Bannon was the subject of a short documentary directed by Ian McFarland entitled "Rungs in a Ladder." In the documentary, Bannon reflected on important moments in his life and his motivation as an artist.

Music career

Converge 
Converge is an American metalcore band formed in the winter of 1990 by vocalist Jacob Bannon and guitarist Kurt Ballou, they were later joined by bassist Jeff Feinburg, and drummer Damon Bellorado. They started by playing covers of hardcore punk, punk rock and heavy metal songs. The band soon graduated to playing live performances in 1991, after recording some demos on a 4-track recorder. Converge have enjoyed a relatively high level of recognition. Their popularity began to rise with the release of breakthrough album, Jane Doe. Converge's records have gradually become more elaborate and expensive to produce. This progression began with their move from a small independent label (Equal Vision Records) to a considerably larger one (Epitaph Records). Special releases have traditionally been handled by Bannon's record label, Deathwish Inc.

Wear Your Wounds 
After Supermachiner released Rise of the Great Machine and after Converge had completed recording Jane Doe, Bannon started writing and recording solo material under the name Dear Lover. Although a number of releases were lined up none of them saw the light of day except a demo version of one track "Grant Me the Strength" which was made available for download on Converge's website in January 2003. The track was supposed to be part of en EP titled The Blood of Thine Enemies, but the EP was never released. The track was later featured on Supermachiner's 2009 album Rust. There was also a Dear Lover double album planned titled Wear Your Wounds to be released on Icarus Records. In January 2005 Dear Lover recordings were said to have been in the editing and mixing process, and it was believed there would be multiple releases of Dear Lover recordings which included the Wear Your Wounds double album throughout the year, however this did not happen. In March 2008 the single "The Blood of Thine Enemies" was released on Deathwish, Bannon released the song under the name J.Bannon. Bannon has said the song was never intended it to be part of an album, only to be a stand-alone piece. Converge's website also changed the use of the name Dear Lover to J.Bannon in the upcoming section where the Wear Your Wounds album was listed. Initially planning since 2008 on releasing solo music under his name only, in 2012 Bannon began using the Wear Your Wounds name for these projects. This allowed others to collaborate and work with Bannon on future projects.

On November 16, 2012, Bannon and Ben Chisholm of Chelsea Wolfe released a split 7-inch EP titled Wear Your Wounds and Revelator, it was the first time Bannon released anything under then name Wear Your Wounds. On January 15, 2013, a digital single was released under the name Wear Your Wounds entitled "The Migration".

The long-awaited Wear Your Wounds album, now titled to the abbreviation WYW was finally given the release date of April 7, 2017, and was released by Deathwish. The album has multiple guest musicians such as Kurt Ballou, Mike McKenzie, Chris Maggio, and Sean Martin. The single "Goodbye Old Friend" was released on January 13, 2017. On March 3, 2017, the non-album single "Arthritic Heart", physical copies where available with New Noise Magazine. Wear Your Wounds' live debut was on April 22 at the Roadburn festival in Tilburg, the Netherlands.

The Wear Your Wounds live band has been described as a supergroup with Bannon on piano, bass and vocal duties, guitarists Mike McKenzie (of The Red Chord) Adam McGrath (of Cave In), Sean Martin (of Hatebreed) and drummer Chris Maggio (of Trap Them). Bannon has said, "[a] lot of them are guys that contributed on the record. We're going to be a three-guitar band and I'll be playing bass sort of intermittently with a lot of the stuff, because there is bass on the record but not all over the place. It's basically a bunch of friends that were available and want to play this sort of music, have fun and explore this world that I started on my own."

Additional projects and contributions

Supermachiner (1994–2000) 
Supermachiner was an experimental rock project formed in 1994 by Jacob Bannon and Ryan Parker. Supermachiner originally began as a collection of 4 track recordings by Bannon and Parker, recorded in 1994. The project remained nameless and dormant for a number of years. With the help and inspiration of his good friend Ryan Parker, they casually brought the project back to life in the winter of 1998. With his input, they developed collective song ideas into the Rise of the Great Machine album, released through Undecided Records. However Bannon continued to write music that was sonically different from Converge, which was later released as solo material many years later. Three of his solo projects, Urtica, The Blood of Thine Enemies and Dear Lover were quickly signed to Undecided Records. Bannon was also commissioned by Undecided Films to compose and record a new score for the 1922 film Nosferatu in 2003.

Irons (2007–2011) 
Irons is a musical collaboration between Jacob Bannon, Dwid Hellion and Stephen Kasner. In 2006 Hellion approached Bannon about creating music together sometime. In late 2007 fine artist and musician Stephen Kasner also expressed interest in working with the pair. This led to the formation of Irons in 2007. The band's goal was to create apocalyptic, non-linear music from a fine art based mindset. Irons only released one split album with Pulling Teeth entitled Grey Savior, the album was released through Deathwish on April 1, 2011 .

Blood from the Soul (2020–present) 
In 2020, Bannon joined the industrial metal supergroup Blood from the Soul, which started out as a collaboration between Shane Embury and Sick of It All vocalist Lou Keller. The line-up of the band also features drummer Dirk Verbeuren and Nasum bassist Jesper Liveröd. The band released the album, DSM-5, in 2020 on Deathwish, Inc. Bannon has handled the vocals and visuals on this record.

Umbra Vitae (2020–present) 
In 2020, Bannon formed the death metal group Umbra Vitae with members of Twitching Tongues, The Red Chord and Uncle Acid & the Deadbeats. The band released its debut album, Shadow of Life in the same year.

Art 

Bannon's art and design career predominately involves doing design work for hardcore punk bands and releasing limited edition art prints. He has stated that his art and design work pays his bills. Since 1997, he has produced art for dozens of bands. Work for these bands has involved packaging, poster, web, apparel, and logo design. Some of his design work has been credited to his art company Atomic! ID. He designed a shirt for the online boutique of Hatebreed's Jamey Jasta, Hatewear. He also is responsible for the art direction, and often the design work, for some of the releases on his Deathwish Inc. record label.

His work has been described as "heavily textured with a kinetic energy and unsettling feel". Tim Lambesis of As I Lay Dying praised Bannon's work on their Shadows Are Security album art and stated that it "is probably the biggest selling record that Jake has ever done artwork for ... [even though] his ethic and his whole approach to art isn't really about sales and numbers." Bannon's style has been influential; as one magazine article put it, he "is often credited with inventing the so-called skull with wings aesthetic that became so popular in the punk underground and mixed martial arts scenes that today knockoffs are available in stores like Target and Marshalls."

In 2004, Bannon released a series of 4 "museum-quality" giclée prints, with a run limited to 100. He has worked with Burlesque Design to have limited series screenprints produced of some of his artwork, including two limited edition Converge tour posters and limited prints based on the album artwork for the Converge albums Jane Doe, No Heroes, and Axe to Fall. The Jane Doe cover art was featured on the cover of the sixth issue of Beautiful/Decay Magazine, which also contained an interview with Bannon. He also designed a limited-edition cover for the May/June 2005 issue of Punk Planet, which was their third Art & Design themed issue.

On August 15, 2004, he participated in Strhess Fest in Cleveland. In February 2008, he participated in the Public Domain group art show, and October 2008, his artwork was featured in a Halloween themed group show entitled Horror Business, both held at Tradition in Los Angeles. In October 2010, Bannon had work in the Scream With Me show at 111 Minna Gallery in San Francisco, which featured the artwork of selected musicians and tattoo artists.

List of bands for whom Bannon has designed 
Bannon has worked on art and design for dozens of bands, including:

 100 Demons
 108
 A Life Once Lost
 Antagonist A.D.
 As I Lay Dying
 Bane
 Blacklisted
 Blood Has Been Shed
 Breaking Pangaea
 Cave In
 Cold World
 Converge
 Cursed
 Death Before Dishonor
 Disfear
 Doomriders
 Drowningman
 Embrace Today
 End of a Year
 Every Time I Die
 Fall Out Boy
 Give Up the Ghost
 Goatwhore
 The Great Deceiver
 Harm's Way
 The Hope Conspiracy
 Integrity
 Killing the Dream
 Knuckledust
 Knut
 Martyr A.D.
 Modern Life Is War
 Narrows
 Nine
 No Warning
 NORA
 Norma Jean
 One King Down
 Orange Island
 P.O.S
 Poison the Well
 Pulling Teeth
 Reach the Sky
 Remembering Never
 Ringworm
 Rise and Fall
 Scars of Tomorrow
 Sepultura
 Shadows Fall
 Shipwreck A.D.
 Supermachiner
 This Is Hell
 Trap Them
 Underoath
 United Nations
 Victims
 Voorhees
 Where Fear and Weapons Meet
 Wovenhand

Businesses

Deathwish Inc. 
Deathwish, Inc. is an independent record label founded by Jacob Bannon of Converge and Tre McCarthy. In late 1999, McCarthy and Bannon decided to turn Deathwish into a full-fledged business.

Diamonds & Rust 
Bannon co-owns a home décor and antique store with his wife in Beverly, Massachusetts called Diamonds & Rust, which offers, "a variety of new/vintage industrial and mid-century furniture and lighting, textiles, art, and other collectibles and accessories."

Discography

As Wear Your Wounds 
Studio albums

EPs

Singles

With Converge 

 Halo in a Haystack (1994)
 Petitioning the Empty Sky (1996)
 When Forever Comes Crashing (1998)
 Jane Doe (2001)
 You Fail Me (2004)
 No Heroes (2006)
 Axe to Fall (2009)
 All We Love We Leave Behind (2012)
 The Dusk in Us (2017)

With Blood from the Soul 
 DSM-5 (2020)

With Supermachiner 

 Rise of the Great Machine (2000)

With Umbra Vitae 

 Shadow of Life (2020)

Art exhibitions 
Bannon has various art/gallery appearances:
 2004: Cleveland, OH, StrHess Festival
 2008: Los Angeles, CA, Tradition Gallery/Store, "Public Domain"
 2010: San Francisco, CA, 111 Minna Gallery, "Scream With Me"
 2011: Beverly, MA, Ursa Major Gallery
 2012: Cleveland, OH, Loren Naji Gallery, "Life & Death ..."
 2012: Salt Lake City, UT, Fice Gallery, "Day of the Dead"
 2012: Austin, TX, Mondo Gallery, "Universal Monsters"
 2013: Boston, MA, Fourth Wall Project Gallery, "Street Diamonds 2"
 2013: Austin, TX, Mondo Gallery, "EC Comics"
 2014: Boston, MA, Distillery Gallery, "Skies, Water, & Death"
 2014: Beverly, MA, Mingo Gallery, "Abstracts & Dimensions"
 2015: Minneapolis, MN, Co-Exhibitions, "Fragments"
 2015: Austin, TX, Fun Fun Fun Fest, "50/50.3 Project Loop"
 2015: Tyler, TX, Preacher Gallery, "50/50.3 Project Loop Benefit"
 2015: Austin, TX, Mondo Gallery, "Originals: No Pop Art Allowed"
 2015: Los Angeles, CA, The Seventh Letter, "The Printed Works of BRLSQ"
 2016: Chicago, IL, Revolution Brewing Co., "Art Gives Me Hope"
 2016: Austin, TX, Mondo Gallery, "House Party"
 2016: Montreal, QC, Neon St. Hubert, Solo art demo
 2017: Tilburg, Holland, "Full Bleed"

See also 
:Category:Albums with cover art by Jacob Bannon
List of vegetarians

References

External links 
 
 
 
 

1976 births
Living people
Album-cover and concert-poster artists
American male singer-songwriters
American contemporary artists
American graphic designers
American lyricists
American music publishers (people)
Hardcore punk musicians
American punk rock musicians
American punk rock singers
American punk rock guitarists
American experimental musicians
American experimental guitarists
Experimental composers
Experimental rock musicians
American heavy metal musicians
American heavy metal singers
American heavy metal guitarists
American rock pianists
American male pianists
Guitarists from Massachusetts
Musicians from Boston
Artists from Boston
Writers from Boston
Businesspeople from Boston
Converge (band) members
Deathwish Inc.
21st-century American pianists
21st-century American guitarists
20th-century American male musicians
21st-century American male singers
21st-century American singers
20th-century American male artists
21st-century American male artists
20th-century American male writers
21st-century American male writers
Undecided Records artists
Singer-songwriters from Massachusetts